Fast Break may refer to:
 Fast break, an offensive play in basketball and handball
 Fast Break (candy), a chocolate bar by the Hershey Company
 Fast Break (film), a 1979 film starring Gabe Kaplan and Bernard King
 Fast Break (radio program), a Philippine radio program
 Fast Break (video game), a 1989 video game by Accolade
 Magic Johnson's Fast Break, a 1988 video game